Evan Glodell is an American feature film director, producer, writer, and actor, best known for directing the indie microbudget film Bellflower.

Early life
Glodell was born in Baraboo, Wisconsin, and briefly attended the University of Wisconsin Milwaukee before dropping out to pursue a career in filmmaking.

Career

Prior to the release of Bellflower, Glodell directed, wrote and starred in the show Boss of the Glory that aired on Stim-TV network.  He also directed the 2009 music video Let Me Up by Cursive.

Glodell is a member of Coatwolf Productions, a collaborative group of actors and filmmakers.

Other work 
Glodell designed a camera known as the Coatwolf Model II, which was used to film Bellflower. The Coatwolf Model II is a modified SI-2K Digital Cinema camera with a 4x5 imaging plane.

During the production of Bellflower, Glodell built several prototypes of the flamethrower that is central to the plot of Bellflower. Glodell also worked alongside co-producer and gaffer Paul Edwardson to make custom modifications to two key vehicles that appear in the film, "Medusa" and "Speed Biscuit".

Filmography

References

External links

Living people
Year of birth missing (living people)
People from Baraboo, Wisconsin
Film directors from Wisconsin